Samad Ali Changezi was a Flight lieutenant in Pakistan Air Force who fought in the Indo-Pakistani War of 1971. He belonged to the Hazara ethnic minority of Quetta, Pakistan and was a member of the No. 9 Squadron – the Pakistan Air Force's first fighter squadron. He remains among the few confirmed aerial combat casualties involving the Lockheed F-104 Starfighter.

Service

Background 

The first direct air-to-air combat engagements between an F-104 and a MiG-21 took place during the war. The first confirmed loss was that of Wing Commander Mervyn Middlecoat over the Gulf of Kutch on 12–13 December 1971. Changezi, flying a Starfighter on loan from Jordan, was the second confirmed F-104 loss, when he was shot down by IAF MiG-21FLs of No. 29 Squadron. The IAF also claimed two additional PAF Starfighter kills that same day, one of which was the aircraft flown by Changezi's wingman, Squadron Leader Rashid Bhatti; the PAF claimed he returned without damage to Masroor.

Battle 

On 17 December 1971, Changezi was on a sortie mission when he spotted two MiG-21FLs, heading for him, on his radar. He tried to maneuver himself between the two MiGs to use his M61 Vulcan gatling cannon, since the PAF jets were not equipped with AIM-9 Sidewinder missiles. As he closed in, the second MiG fired two K-13 missiles, one of which hit him. He failed to eject and his crash was witnessed by Indian pilots.

Honors and awards

Changezi was shot down in his eleventh war sortie. For his valour and sacrifice, he was awarded the Sitara-e-Jurat, the third-highest gallantry honour of Pakistan.

See also 

 List of Hazara people
 List of people from Quetta
 General Muhammad Musa Khan Hazara
 Air Marshal Sharbat Ali Changezi
 No. 9 Squadron (Pakistan Air Force)

References

Pakistani people of Hazara descent
Hazara military personnel
People from Quetta
Pakistan Air Force personnel
Recipients of Sitara-e-Jurat
1971 deaths
Year of birth missing
Aviators killed by being shot down
Pakistani military personnel killed in action